Coleophora gongliuensis is a moth of the family Coleophoridae. It is found in Xinjiang, China.

References
 , 2004: Six new species of the genus Coleophora Hübner from China (Lepidoptera: Coleophoridae). Acta Zootaxonomica Sinica 29 (2): 314-323.

gongliuensis
Moths described in 2004
Moths of Asia